This is a list of theaters in North Korea.

 April 25 House of Culture
 Central Youth Hall
 East Pyongyang Grand Theatre
 Hamhung Grand Theatre
 International Cinema Hall
 Kalma Theatre
 Mansudae Art Theatre
 Mansudae People's Theatre
 Moranbong Theatre
 People's Palace of Culture
 Ponghwa Art Theatre
 Pyongyang Circus
 Pyongyang Grand Theatre
 Pyongyang Puppet Theatre (formerly State Arts Theatre, originally Pyongyang Public Hall)
 Pyongyang Moranbong Circus
 Taedongmoon Cinema

External links 

 Democratic People's Republic of Korea - Theatres

 
 
North Korea
Theatres